The North Wing ATF (Air Time Fix) is an American single-seat ultralight trike designed and produced by North Wing Design of East Wenatchee, Washington. The aircraft is supplied as a kit for amateur construction.

Design and development
The ATF is a nanotrike intended for use as a motorglider, taking off under power and then shutting down the engine for soaring flight.

It features a minimalist design, cable-braced hang glider-style high-wing, weight-shift controls, a single-seat, open cockpit, tricycle landing gear and a single engine in pusher configuration.

The aircraft is made from bolted-together aluminum tubing, with its double-surface wing covered in Dacron sailcloth. Its  span Stratus XP wing is supported by cables and kingpost and is weight-shift controlled by an "A" frame control bar. The original wing offered by the manufacturer was the Stratos, but this was replaced by the improved Stratus XP in 2010. The Stratos XP features fiberglass wingtips, a different shaped sail providing a better glide ratio and lower sink rate.

The aircraft was originally powered by the  Zenoah G-25 single cylinder, two-stroke engine. Engines available in 2012 are the  Simonini Mini2,  Zanzottera MZ 34,  Vittorazi 185 and the  Bailey V4-200 powerplants.

The ATF can be folded up to 27" x 30" x 55" (69 x 76 x 140 cm) for storage or ground transport.

Specifications (ATF with Stratus XP 17.5 wing)

References

External links

ATF
1990s United States ultralight aircraft
Homebuilt aircraft
Single-engined pusher aircraft
Ultralight trikes